Erhart Aten (1932–2004) was a Micronesian politician who served as the first elected Governor of Chuuk State (then called Truk). Aten took office in 1978 after self-government was implemented. He stepped down from office in 1986 after serving two, four-year terms as Governor and was succeeded by Gideon Doone. Aten graduated from Xavier High School, a Jesuit secondary school located on Chuuk, in 1962.

In late November 2004, Aten and three other men were crossing Chuuk lagoon to Weno island when their boat was hit by a storm. Their boat and all on board were lost at sea.

See also
List of people who disappeared mysteriously at sea

References

1932 births
2000s missing person cases
2004 deaths
Deaths by drowning
Federated States of Micronesia politicians
Governors of Chuuk State
Missing people
People from Chuuk State
People lost at sea